Pocol is a village and ski resort in the Veneto region of northeast Italy. The village is a località of the comune of Cortina d'Ampezzo, in the province of Belluno.

Geography
Pocol lies in the Dolomites, at 1,535 meters above sea level.

History

Pocol also has a war cemetery established in 1935 which contains the remains of 9,707 Italian soldiers (4,455 unknown) and 37 Austrians.

Economy
Pocol is a popular area for skiing and snowboarding.

References

Dolomiti.org interactive map showing Pocol
Maplandia location of Pocol
Pocol War Cemetery information
Ski and Snowboard Europe information on Cortina d'Ampezzo, including Pocol

Frazioni of Cortina d'Ampezzo
Ski areas and resorts in Italy